Corringham may refer to:
Corringham, Essex, England
Corringham, Lincolnshire, England